Maurice Dommanget (1888–1976) was a French historian of labor and socialist movements.

Daniel Guérin described Dommanget as "renowned for his tireless erudition".

References 

1888 births
1976 deaths
20th-century French historians
Historians of socialism
Writers from Paris